James Stoddard may refer to:

James Stoddard (author), American fantasy author
James Stoddard (Medal of Honor) (1838–?), United States Navy sailor and Medal of Honor recipient

See also
Jamie Stoddard (born 1977), Canadian football player
James Stodart (1849—1922), Australian politician
Sir James Fraser Stoddart (born 1942), Scottish chemist